Maria Llorença Requenses Llong (Italian: Maria Lorenza Longo; 1463 – 21 December 1539) was a Spanish Roman Catholic professed religious and the founder of the Capuchin Poor Clares. Llong founded the hospital of "Santa Maria del Popolo" in Naples where she relocated to (and where she was widowed) and which received numerous papal privileges from Pope Leo X and Pope Adrian VI.

Llong was titled as a Servant of God after the cause for her canonization commenced under Pope Leo XIII on 4 September 1892. Pope Francis named her as Venerable on 9 October 2017 upon confirming her heroic virtue. The Pope later approved a miracle attributed to her in 2020 which enabled for her beatification which was celebrated in Naples on 9 October 2021.

Life
Maria Llorença Llong was born in Lleida sometime in 1463 to nobles and she relocated to Naples in 1506 alongside her husband Juan Llong (who enjoyed the favor of Ferdinand II of Aragon) despite being paralyzed at the time. Her husband died in 1509 and left her with her three children at which point she went on a pilgrimage to Loreto where she was cured of her paralysis in what she attributed to the intercession of the Blessed Virgin Mary.

Llong became a member of the Franciscans and she founded both a house to care for prostitutes in 1526 and a hospital for ill people. Llong established the hospital of Santa Maria del Popolo in 1519. Llong wanted to go on a pilgrimage but she had a vision that revealed that she should create a women's convent called "Santa Maria in Gerasalamme" and she wanted to re-establish the original concepts of being simple and humble in addition to poorness of spirit and adherence to the austerities of Francis of Assisi and Clare of Assisi. This re-establishment followed the lead that Matteo da Bascio had set when he founded the order of the Capuchin monks.

Llong's new order was organised with the aid of the Capuchins. Her new order took the habit of the monks and became known as the Capuchin Poor Clares. Like the monks the nuns wore a simple brown tunic knotted with a cord at the waist and a short cape. The sole addition for the nuns was a wimple and a black veil. During her lifetime the first group was copied around the Italian mainland attracting funding from a range of female philanthropists. Her idea to launch an order along the lines of Clare of Assisi was seen as a move to establish the fundermental principles that she established in 1212. In 1533 she chose as her spiritual director Gaetano dei Conti di Thiene.

The founder sought to obtain papal approval for her convent and this led to Pope Paul III issuing his approval in "Debitum Pastoralis Officii" on 19 February 1535 and later for the official founding on 10 December 1538. Her hospital also received numerous papal privileges from Pope Leo X and Pope Adrian VI while Gian Pietro Carafa - the future Pope Paul IV - supported the founding and maintenance of the hospital.

Llong died in Naples on 21 December 1539. Her remains were exhumed in 1935 and all that remained was a skull so it was placed in an urn in her convent.

Beatification
The beatification process commenced in an informative process in Naples that Guglielmo Sanfelice d'Acquavilla inaugurated on 9 November 1880 and later closed on 20 March 1883. Theologians assumed charge of all of her writings and approved them to be orthodox on 17 May 1890 - this also allowed for her spiritual writings to be investigated since it formed a critical part of the beatification cause.

The official start to the cause came on 4 September 1892 under Pope Leo XIII and she was titled as a Servant of God. Sanfelice opened an apostolic process on 2 December 1893 and the process concluded on 19 December 1903 when Giuseppe Antonio Ermenegildo Prisco closed it. The Congregation of Rites validated the processes on 27 November 1907 and went on to remain inactive for several decades. On 12 June 2004 the then-Capuchin postulator in charge of Franciscan causes Florio Tessari filed a petition to Cardinal Michele Giordano to reopen the cause and the cardinal oversaw the supplementary process from 29 June 2004 until 16 May 2005. The cause's official re-opening was approved on 30 November 2005 after the Congregation for the Causes of Saints issued the official "nihil obstat" and then validated the supplementary process on 1 February 2008.

The postulation submitted the Positio to the C.C.S. in 2015 and a board of historians approved the cause and the contents of the dossier on 1 September 2015. Theologians met to discuss and approve the cause on 9 March 2017; Pope Francis confirmed her heroic virtue and named her as Venerable on 9 October 2017. Pope Francis later approved a miracle attributed to her on 27 October 2020; this enabled for her beatification to be celebrated in Naples on 9 October 2021 with Cardinal Marcello Semeraro presiding over the rite on the Pope's behalf. In attendance was the Capuchin Archbishop of Santiago Cardinal Celestino Aós Braco and the Archbishop of Naples Domenico Battaglia.

The current postulator for this cause is Carlo Calloni.

On 8 March 2005 a dossier was found on an alleged miracle that recorded the cure of Maria Cherubina Pirro who was cured of severe tuberculosis on 15 October 1881 after visiting the remains of Llong.

References

External links
Hagiography Circle

1463 births
1542 deaths
15th-century venerated Christians
15th-century Catalan people
16th-century venerated Christians
People from Lleida
Capuchin Poor Clares
16th-century Spanish nuns
Venerated Catholics by Pope Francis
15th-century Spanish women
Beatifications by Pope Francis